San Felipe, officially the Municipality of San Felipe (Filipino: Bayan ng San Felipe), is a 4th class municipality in the province of Zambales, Philippines. According to the 2020 census, it has a population of 25,033 people.

Much of the population are Ilocanos, descendants of migrants from Ilocos. 

The town was affected by the 1991 Mount Pinatubo eruption, being buried in about a meter in volcanic ash but damage was comparatively light.

History 

San Felipe was one of the little villages along the coastal region of Zambales during the pre-Spanish period.  The first inhabitants were the Malay Zambals who lived in lowland which they themselves called Hindol. There were also Negritoes, but most of them lived in the mountains.

A few years after the Spanish discovery of the Philippines, all places in the country had been explored by the Spanish authorities. The exploration of Zambales began in 1572 by Juan de Salcedo, grandson of Miguel Lopez de Legaspi, first Spanish Governor General of the Philippines.  Juan de Salcedo and Spanish followers made a survey of its coastal region, and organized communities which were first called encomiendas but later called pueblos.  Around the early and mid-19th century, as the population of the villages increased due to the steady immigration of Ilocanos from the Ilocandia region, more pueblos were organized.

The first waves of Ilocanos found their way to Hindol, which was later called Sindol, and less than the kilometers south of Sindol was the place called Bobulon.  Hindol was a Zambal Aeta name of a tree than abundant in the place.  Bobulon was also a kind tree then abundant at the Public Plaza.  However, there was another version why it was called Bobulon.  It was said that the first voyage of Ilocano settlers had all the favorable wind (bulon) from Paoay, Ilocos Norte to this village.  The other waves of Ilocano settlers, who were mostly merchants and fishermen, came from Vigan and San Vincente, Ilocos Sur.

The first seat of the pueblo government was in Sindol and the head of the pueblo was called Capitan Municipal who as head of the pueblo was responsible in paying the taxes which could not be collected from his barangays which were headed by Cabezas de barangay.  As gathered from reliable sources, one of the town executives when the seat of the government was still here in Sindol was Capitan Municipal Pedro Farañal, father of the late Municipal President Juan Farañal.  The pueblo was later transferred from Sindol to Bobulon because the latter was already more populated, had a wider area for residential purposes, and it was farther from the mountains were the aetas, still wild lived.  The name Bobulon was changed to San Felipe when it was founded in 1853.  As to how the town of San Felipe got its present name, the most reliable fact learned so far was that four “saintly” brothers from Ilocandia, namely Marcelino, Antonio, Narciso and Felipe settled in the about to be organized pueblos which were later named San Marcelino, San Antonio, San Narciso and San Felipe.  As a matter of fact, most of the inhabitants of these four towns were Ilocanos from the Ilocos region.  Under the Spanish regime and during the early part of American regime, San Felipe was a separate town.  Its first Municipal President was Don Saturnino Pastor who was the town executive from January 1, 1901, to December 31, 1902.  For the purpose of governmental administration, San Felipe was incorporated with San Narciso, The Municipal President of the combined towns of San Felipe and San Narciso was Don Simeon Maranon and Nicolas Amagna was the Municipal Vice-president.  Being a smaller town, San Felipe was only entitled to four Councilors while San Narciso had five.  The councilors for San Felipe were – Don Juan Farañal, Don Victorino Amancio, Don Alejo Apostol and Don Macario Manglicmot.  These officials, together with some others in San Felipe, later worked for the separation of San Felipe from San Narciso through Don Alberto Barretto, who was then a member of the first Philippine Assembly.  Meanwhile, before the separation Don Angel Dumlao y Farrales, from San Narciso, took over as Municipal President for San Felipe – San Narciso covering the period from January 1, 1905, to February 28, 1908.

Under the combined leadership of Nicolas Amagna, Flaviano Dumlao, Severo Amagna, Nemesio Farrales, Isidoro Fuenticilla and Joaquin Feria a resolution was adopted to effect the final separation of San Felipe from San Narciso.  On March 1, 1908, San Felipe was formally separated from San Narciso and the first Municipal officials after separation were;

 Nicolas Amagna - Municipal President
 Isidoro Fuenticilla - Mun. Vice-president
 Santiago Labrador - Councilor
 Flaviano Dumlao - Councilor
 Jose Abille - Councilor
 Leoncio Borja - Councilor
 Bartolome Mendaros - Councilor
 Nemesio Farrales - Councilor
 Joaquin Feria - Councilor
 Macario Rico - Councilor

Barangays (district) in the poblacion and barangays (barrios) outside the town proper.

Barangays in the poblacion and their names :

Barangay Apostol has been named in honor of the late Capitan Municipal Juan Apostol, Barangay Manglicmot has been named in honor of the late Capitanes Municipal – Julian Manglicmot, Casimiro Manglicmot and Lope Manglicmot.  Barangay Feria has been named in honor of the late Capitan Municipal Ambrosio Feria, Barangay Amagna has been named in honor of Municipal President Nicolas Amagna.  Barangay Rosete has been named in honor of the late Capitan Municipal Pedro Rosete.  Barangay Farañal has been named in honor of the late Capitan Municipal Pedro Farañal when the seat of the government was still in Sindol.

Barangays outside the poblacion and their names :

Barangay Balincaguing's name was derived from the Zambal word balin which means house or home and caguing which means wild bats.

Geography

Barangays
San Felipe is subdivided into 11 barangays.

 Amagna (Poblacion)
 Apostol (Poblacion) 
 Balincaguing 
 Farañal (Poblacion) 
 Feria (Poblacion) 
 Maloma 
 Manglicmot (Poblacion) 
 Rosete (Poblacion) 
 San Rafael 
 Santo Niño 
 Sindol

Climate

Demographics

Religion

There are local branches of the Christian denominations of Methodist, Philippine Independent Church, International Assemblies of the First Born, Jesus is Lord and Roman Catholic Church.

The Cathedral of San Roque (Saint Roch in English), the episcopal see of the Zambales diocese of the Philippine Independent Church is located next to the plaza.

The local parish of the Catholic Church is also dedicated to San Roque and was staffed by the Columban Fathers until recent years.

Economy

Education
There are private, public and parochial elementary, high schools and technological college in San Felipe.

Elementary 

Public
 San Felipe Central Elementary School (East)
 San Felipe Central Elementary School (West)
 Santo Nino Elementary School
 Maloma Community Elementary School
 Santo Tomas Elementary School
 Bubolon Elementary School
 Sindol Elementary School
 San Rafael Elementary School
 Balincaguing Elementary School
 Laoag Elementary School
 Sagpat Elementary School

Private
 Pedro M. Arce Ecumenical School, Inc.
 Luke 19:4 Child Development Center, Inc
 Saint Columban's Montessori School

High schools 

Public

 Governor Manuel D. Barretto National High School
 San Rafael Technical Vocational High School
 Sagpat High School
 Don Getulio Feria Arindaeng High School
 Paite- Balincaguing National High School

Private
 Zambales Central Institute
 St. Columban's Montessori School
 Technological College of San Felipe, Inc.

Colleges 

 Technological College of San Felipe

Landmarks and places of interest

 Century Old Tree: Situated in Barangay Maloma, San Felipe, Zambales.
 Coastal Beach Area: Barangay Santo Nino, San Felipe, Zambales.
 Barrio Liwliwa: Liwliwa is a prime surfing spot three hours away from Manila. Resorts includes Kapitan's Liwa Surf Resort, Kuya Bot's, Board Culture Liw-Liwa (BCL), La Sarina, Aragoza Beach Resort, The Circle Hostel and Camp Rofelio Surfing Beach Resort in San Felipe.
 Lubong-Nangoloan Waterfalls: Situated in Barangay Feria, San Felipe, Zambales.
 Grotto Falls: Situated in Barangay Feria, San Felipe, Zambales.
 Benedictine Retreat House: This retreat house is run by the Benedictine sisters and was constructed on land donated by the Sebastian family. The late Sister Henrietta Sebastian was a nun of the Benedictine order. A number of schools and religious groups, even as far away from Manila, conduct their retreats in this facility. The compound also houses relocated groups that were displaced by Mt. Pinatubo. You can also buy religious articles from them (for pasalubongs).
 Sabangan of the North: A picnic and/or scenic site. From Sindol cars, jeeps, SUVs and tricycles can easily navigate the road which is part concrete and dirt road to take you to there.
 Brandenburg Resort: Located at Barangay Sindol, San Felipe, Zambales.
 Montecruz Beach Resort: Located at Barangay Santo Nino, San Felipe.
 Greenspace Artist Village: Located at Liwliwa, San Felipe, Zambales.

Gallery

References

External links

San Felipe Profile at PhilAtlas.com
Website
[ Philippine Standard Geographic Code]
Philippine Census Information

Municipalities of Zambales